Ameur Seflia is a small town and rural commune in Kenitra Province of the Rabat-Salé-Kénitra region of Morocco.

At the time of the 2014 census, the commune had a total population of 28,540 people living in 4,882 households.

See also 
 PSA Kenitra plant
 Kénitra Province

References

Populated places in Kénitra Province